The weak mixing angle or Weinberg angle is a parameter in the Weinberg–Salam theory of the electroweak interaction, part of the Standard Model of particle physics, and is usually denoted as . It is the angle by which spontaneous symmetry breaking rotates the original  and  vector boson plane, producing as a result the  boson, and the photon. Its measured value is slightly below 30°, but also varies, very slightly increasing, depending on how high the relative momentum of the particles involved in the interaction is that the angle is used for.

Details
'mixing') that simultaneously produces the massive  boson and the massless photon is expressed by the formula

 and 

The electric charge is then expressible in terms of it,  (refer to the figure).

Because the value of the mixing angle is currently determined empirically, in the absence of any superseding theoretical derivation it is mathematically defined as

The value of  varies as a function of the momentum transfer, at which it is measured. This variation, or 'running', is a key prediction of the electroweak theory.

In practice, the quantity  is more frequently used. These values correspond to a Weinberg angle varying between 28.7° and 29.3° ≈ 30°.

CODATA 2018 gives the value

Footnotes

References

 
 
 
 

Electroweak theory
Angle
Dimensionless numbers
Physical constants